The 1927 Akron Zippers football team was an American football team that represented the University of Akron in the Ohio Athletic Conference (OAC) during the 1927 college football season. In its first season under head coach Red Blair, the team compiled a 5–3 record (4–3 against conference opponents) and outscored all opponents by a total of 145 to 79. Ben Baldwin was the team captain.

Schedule

References

Akron
Akron Zips football seasons
Akron Zippers football